Dasyuris is a genus of moths in the family Geometridae first described by Achille Guenée in 1868.

Species
Species within this genus are as follows:
Dasyuris anceps Butler, 1877
Dasyuris anceps grisescens Dugdale, 1988
Dasyuris austrina Philpott, 1928
Dasyuris callicrena Meyrick, 1883
Dasyuris catadees Prout, 1939
Dasyuris enysii Butler, 1877
Dasyuris fulminea Philpott, 1915
Dasyuris hectori Butler, 1877
Dasyuris leucobathra Meyrick, 1910
Dasyuris micropolis Meyrick, 1929
Dasyuris octans Hudson, 1923
Dasyuris partheniata Guenée, 1868
Dasyuris pluviata Hudson, 1928
Dasyuris strategica Meyrick, 1883
Dasyuris transaurea Howes, 1912

References

Geometridae genera
Endemic fauna of New Zealand
Endemic moths of New Zealand